Ottenschlag Airport is a private use airport located  south-southwest of Ottenschlag, Lower Austria, Austria.

See also
List of airports in Austria

References

External links 
 Airport record for Ottenschlag Airport at Landings.com

Airports in Lower Austria